Irkutsk Governorate was an administrative division (a guberniya) of the Russian Empire, located in Siberia. It existed from 1764 to 1926; its seat was in the city of Irkutsk.

References

 
Governorates of the Russian Empire
1764 establishments in the Russian Empire
States and territories disestablished in 1926